Carrigeen GAA an Irish Gaelic Athletic Association club situated in Carrigeen in the very far south of County Kilkenny, Ireland. They are Mooncoin GAA's reserve team. The club was established in 1954 and its home grounds are at Asper Park, which were officially opened in 1991 by Paddy Buggy of Slieverue, former President of the GAA. Carrigeen play in black and amber stripes. As of 2008, the club was reportedly spending €500,000 developing its grounds, with the National Lottery putting up €200,000, Kilkenny County Council €100,000, and the club raising the remaining €200,000.

People 
Bob O'Keeffe, after whom the trophy awarded for the Leinster Senior Hurling Championship is named, was a native of Glengrant, Mooncoin. O'Keeffe became a prominent figure in the Gaelic Athletic Association (GAA) councils and was president of the association from 1935 to 1938. After his death, the GAA decided to donate a trophy in his memory—the Bob O'Keeffe Memorial Cup. The hurler depicted on the top of the cup is barefooted, which is significant in view of the fact that Bob O'Keeffe originally played in that manner.

Honours

 Kilkenny Junior 'B' Hurling League: (1) 2015
 Southern Kilkenny Junior 'B' Hurling League: (1) 2015

References

Gaelic games clubs in County Kilkenny
Hurling clubs in County Kilkenny